The National Center for Film and Video Preservation was established in 1984 by the American Film Institute and the National Endowment for the Arts to

 coordinate American moving image preservation activities on a national scale serving as Secretariat for the Association of Moving Image Archivists and The Film Foundation.
 implement the National Moving Image Database.
 research and publish the AFI Catalog of Feature Films.
 locate and acquire films and television programs for inclusion in the AFI Collection to be preserved at the Library of Congress and other archives.
 establish ongoing relationships between the public archives and the film and television industry.
 create broader public awareness of preservation needs.

The center has a list of wanted films believed to be lost. Some of the films on that list are

Cleopatra (1917)
The Divine Woman (1928)
Camille (1927)

See also 
List of lost films
List of incomplete or partially lost films

References 

Film preservation organizations
American Film Institute
Film organizations in the United States